The MQM-42 was a supersonic target drone developed by North American Aviation (from 1967 North American Rockwell). Developed in two subvariants, Redhead and Roadrunner, it was used by the United States Army in the 1960s and 1970s.

Design and development
Given the company designation NA-273, the Redhead/Roadrunner drone program produced a small aircraft of largely conventional design, with small delta wings and a downswept tailplane; the vertical stabilizer doubled as a pylon for the aircraft's ramjet engine. A solid-propellant rocket provided thrust until the ramjet reached operating speed; launch was from the same launcher as that used by the MGR-3 Little John battlefield rocket. An autopilot, set to maintain a preset altitude, provided control of the drone; radio command guidance from a ground control station could override the autopilot. At the end of a flight, if the target drone had not been shot down, recovery could be either on command from the ground station, or automatic in case of fuel exhaustion or loss of control; a retrorocket would decelerate the drone to allow for deployment of a recovery parachute.

Operational history
First flight of the NA-273 took place in 1961; in 1963, the designation MQM-42A was applied to both variants. The MQM-42 was used primarily to provide training in tracking and engaging targets for the MIM-23 Hawk surface-to-air missile; it remained in service with the United States Army through the mid-1970s.

Specifications (MQM-42A)

See also

References

Citations

Bibliography

MQM-042
1960s United States special-purpose aircraft
Target drones of the United States
Ramjet-powered aircraft
Mid-wing aircraft
Single-engined jet aircraft